Yerği Kek is a village in the Qusar Rayon of Azerbaijan. The village forms part of the municipality of Sudur.

Population
Ethnic Lezgins live in the village. In the village of Yerği Kek where nearly 40 people live.

References

Populated places in Qusar District